Royal Air Force Wig Bay or more simply RAF Wig Bay is a former Royal Air Force station near Stranraer, Dumfries and Galloway, Scotland

The following squadrons were here at some point:

Units
 Detachment of No. 4 (Coastal) Operational Training Unit RAF (February 1942 - ?)
 No. 11 Flying Boat Fitting Unit (July - October 1943)
 No. 57 Maintenance Unit RAF (October 1943 - October 1951)
 Flying Boat Servicing Unit (March - September 1942) became No. 1 Flying Boat Servicing Unit (September 1942 - February 1944)

References

Citations

Bibliography

Wig Bay